Abubakar Kyari  (born 15 January 1963) is a Nigerian Politician. He was the senator representing Borno North Senatorial District of Borno State at the 9th National Assembly from 2015 unitl his resignation in April 2022. He is a member of the All Progressives Congress.

Early life and education
Kyari was born in Borno State. His father was Late Brigadier Abba Kyari - Former military administrator to North Central from 1967 to 1975.
He has eight siblings.

He was educated in both Nigeria and United States of America. He attended Kaduna Capital School in 1974. He then proceeded to Barewa College Zaria where he obtained his WASSCE In 1979. He attended the University of Tennessee Martin in USA where he obtained a bachelor's degree in 1986. Thereafter in 1989, he attended Webster University St.Louis Missouri USA for his Masters in Business Administration (MBA).

Political career
1) Elected to the House of Representatives (UNCP) 1998

2) State Treasurer All Peoples Party APP Borno State 1998 – 1999

3) Re-Elected to the House of Representatives (APP) 1999 – 2003

4) Hon Commissioner Water Resources, Borno State 2003 – 2005

5) MD Rural Water Supply Agency, Borno State 2005 – 2007

6) Hon Commissioner Education, Borno State 2007 – 2008

7) Hon Commissioner Water Resources, Borno State 2008 – 2010

8) Hon Commissioner Home Affairs and Information 2010 – 2011

9) Hon Commissioner Works 2011 – 2011

10) Chief of Staff, Government House Borno State 2011 – 2014

11) Elected Senator Federal Republic of Nigeria (APC) 2015 – 2019

12) Re-Elected Senator (APC) 2019 – date

Award 

In October 2022, a Nigerian national honour of Commander Of The Order Of The Niger (CON) was conferred on him by President Muhammadu Buhari.

References

External links
Sen. Abubakar Kyari - National Assembly

Living people
All Progressives Congress politicians
Barewa College alumni
Members of the House of Representatives (Nigeria)
Members of the Senate (Nigeria)
People from Borno State
University of Tennessee alumni
1964 births